The Atari Panther was a cancelled video game console from Atari Corporation that was planned to be the successor to the Atari 7800 and the Atari XEGS. It was developed by the same ex-Sinclair team, Flare Technology, who were previously responsible for two cancelled console projects: the Flare One and the Konix Multisystem.

Work started in 1988 with a planned release in 1991 to directly compete with the Super Nintendo Entertainment System and the Sega Genesis. Atari abandoned the project in favor of the Jaguar.

Hardware
The system features three chips, consisting of a Motorola 68000 running at 16 MHz, an object processor called the "Panther", and an Ensoniq sound processor nicknamed "Otis", featuring 32 sound channels (presumably an ES5505). The Panther was never commercially released as the design was eclipsed by that of the Jaguar.

References

External links
Atari Panther history & information

Panther
Vaporware game consoles
68k-based game consoles